Eupithecia mandschurica is a moth in the  family Geometridae. It is found in Russia (Amur) and Japan.

Subspecies
Eupithecia mandschurica mandschurica
Eupithecia mandschurica japonica Inoue, 1979 (Japan)

References

Moths described in 1897
mandschurica
Moths of Japan
Moths of Asia